Richard Boyle Bernard (4 September 1787- 2 March 1850) was an MP and  Dean of Leighlin in the Nineteenth century.

Bernard was educated at St John's College, Cambridge and ordained in 1815. He became Rector of Glenkeen in 1820; and Dean of Leighlin in 1822. He was MP for Bandon Bridge from 1812 to 1815.

References

External links 
 
 
 

1787 births
1850 deaths
Alumni of St John's College, Cambridge
Deans of Leighlin
Members of the Parliament of the United Kingdom for County Cork constituencies (1801–1922)
UK MPs 1812–1818